Firebaugh may refer to:

People
Andrew D. Firebaugh, California pioneer, founder of Firebaugh, California
Douglas Firebaugh, an author
Francille Firebaugh, former professor and dean emerita of the College of Human Ecology at Cornell University
Marco Antonio Firebaugh, former Assembleyman
W. C. Firebaugh, an author

Places
Firebaugh, California
Firebaugh Airport
Marco Antonio Firebaugh High School

Fictional 
Wanda Firebaugh, a character in the webcomic Erfworld